The 1995 Mr. Olympia contest was an IFBB professional bodybuilding competition held on September 10, 1995, at the Atlanta Civic Center in Atlanta, Georgia.

Results
The total prize money awarded was $275,000.

Notable events
Dorian Yates won his fourth consecutive Mr. Olympia title

References

External links 
 Mr. Olympia
 1995 IFBB Mr. Olympia Bodybuilding Contest "Wins Dorian Yates"

 1995
1995 in American sports
Mr. Olympia
1995 in bodybuilding